Damien Da Silva (born 17 May 1988) is a French professional footballer who plays as a defender for A-League Men’s club Melbourne Victory

Club career
On 16 July 2009, it was announced that Da Silva had signed a three-year contract with Châteauroux after rejecting a new deal with Chamois Niortais.

On 27 May 2021, Da Silva signed a two-year contract with Lyon, leaving Rennes, where he was captain, on a free transfer.

On 3 February 2023, Lyon stated that Da Silva joined Australian club Melbourne Victory, with the latter confirming that Da Silva had signed for the club until the end of the 2023-24 A-League Men season.

International career
Da Silva was born in France to a Portuguese father and French mother. In the 2006–07 season, Da Silva was awarded 2 caps for the France under-19 team. He scored a goal on his debut in a 3–0 victory over Finland U-19 on 15 October 2006.

Honours
Stade Rennais
Coupe de France: 2018–19

References

External links
 
 

1988 births
Living people
People from Talence
Sportspeople from Gironde
Association football defenders
French footballers
France youth international footballers
French people of Portuguese descent
Chamois Niortais F.C. players
LB Châteauroux players
FC Rouen players
Clermont Foot players
Stade Malherbe Caen players
Stade Rennais F.C. players
Olympique Lyonnais players
Melbourne Victory FC players
Ligue 1 players
Ligue 2 players
Championnat National players
Footballers from Nouvelle-Aquitaine
French expatriate footballers
Expatriate soccer players in Australia
French expatriate sportspeople in Australia